("Practice") is a Norwegian magazine, published by the Workers Youth League.

Thus  was the official organ of the Left Communist Youth League, and was published fortnightly. When the Left Communist Youth League merged with the Socialist Youth League of Norway to form the Workers Youth League in 1927,  absorbed the Socialist Youth League organ .

References 

1923 establishments in Norway
Labour Party (Norway) newspapers
Magazines established in 1923
Magazines published in Oslo
Norwegian-language magazines
Political magazines published in Norway
Socialist magazines